27th Battalion may refer to:

 27th Battalion (Australia), a unit of the Australian Army 
 2/27th Battalion (Australia), a unit of the Australian Army 
 27th Battalion (City of Winnipeg), CEF, a unit of the Canadian Army
 27th Jäger Battalion (Finland), a unit of the German Army 1915–1918 consisted mainly of volunteers from Finland
 27e bataillon de chasseurs alpins, a unit of the French Army
 27 Infantry Battalion (Ireland), a unit of the Irish Army
 27th Machine-Gun Battalion (New Zealand), a unit of the 2nd New Zealand Division during the Second World War
 27th Battalion Virginia Partisan Rangers, a cavalry unit in the Confederate States Army during the American Civil War 
 27th Engineer Battalion (United States), a unit of the United States Army

See also
 27th Army (disambiguation)
 27th Brigade (disambiguation)
 XXVII Corps (disambiguation)
 27th Division (disambiguation)
 27th Regiment (disambiguation)
 27 Squadron (disambiguation)